Journey Through the Solar System was a 13-episode documentary series produced by NASA's Lewis Research Center in 1983. Each half-hour episode contained the entirety or clips of older NASA films with framing host footage with Larry Ross, Director of Space Science at Lewis.

While the material is dated due to later discoveries, it was considered as up-to-date for the time.

Episodes
(original source material listed underneath)

 1  "Our Star, The Sun"
 "Partnership in Space: Mission Helios" (clips)
 2  "Mercury, Exploration of a Planet" 
 a  "Our Solar System" (juv)
 b  "Mercury, Exploration of a Planet" (clips)
 3  "The Veil of Venus"
 "Venus Pioneer" (27 min)
 4  "Earth, The Planet"
 "Earth, Space, Our Environment"
 5  "Assignment- Shoot the Moon"
 (The Challenge of Space) "Assignment- Shoot the Moon"
 6  "The Moon and Us" 
 -- consists of clips from several NASA films including:
 ? The Flight of Apollo 8 (N- Burgess Meredith)
 ? Apollo 10, Dress Rehearsal to the Moon
 ? July 20, 1969 (Apollo 11)
 ? Apollo 12
 ? The Flight of Apollo 15
 ? The Flight of Apollo 16
 ? The Flight of Apollo 17
 7  "The Fourth Planet" 
 "Mars: The Search Begins"
 8  "Life on Mars" 
 a  "Mars: Is There Life?" (undated, but app before 1976 Viking landings; 14 min)
 b  "19 Minutes to Earth" (1978; 14 min)
 9  "Jupiter Odyssey"
 "Jupiter Odyssey" (Pioneer 10)
 10  Jupiter: A Clearer Picture
 b  "Galileo: Mission to Jupiter" (?1984; c 5 min)
 11  "Pioneer-Saturn Encounter"
 12  
 (?Voyager 2 at Saturn)
 13  "The Outer Planets & Beyond" 
 b  "Comets- Windows Into Time" (1981; 6.5 min)

References

1983 American television series debuts
1980s American documentary television series
Documentary television series about astronomy
Documentary films about outer space
Documentary television series about science
Glenn Research Center